"Måndagsbarn" is a single by Swedish singer Veronica Maggio, from her second studio album Och vinnaren är... It was released in Sweden as a digital download on 11 February 2008. The song peaked at number 23 on the Swedish Singles Chart, number eight on the Danish Singles Chart and number one on the Norwegian Singles Chart.

Music video
A music video to accompany the release of "Måndagsbarn" was first released onto YouTube on 3 March 2008 at a total length of three minutes and twenty-seven seconds.

Track listing
Digital download
 "Måndagsbarn" - 3:28
 "Måndagsbarn" (Instrumental version) - 3:28
 "Måndagsbarn" (A cappella version) - 2:59

Charts

Release history

References

2008 singles
Veronica Maggio songs
2008 songs
Universal Music Group singles
Number-one singles in Norway
Songs written by Veronica Maggio
Songs written by Oskar Linnros